KBHI (107.1 FM) is a radio station broadcasting a rock music format. Licensed to Miner, Missouri, United States, the station is currently owned by Withers Broadcasting, through licensee Withers Broadcasting Company of Southeast Missouri, LLC.

References

External links
 Official Website
 

BHI
Radio stations established in 1992